Spoken and written Vietnamese today uses the Latin script-based Vietnamese alphabet to represent Vietnamese words which are of Chinese origin (Hán-Việt, or Sino-Vietnamese), native Vietnamese words (thuần Việt), and other foreign loanwords. Historic Vietnamese literature was written by scholars in Nôm and before that Hán (Chinese characters).

During ancient times, the ancestors of the Vietnamese were considered to have been Proto-Austroasiatic (also called Proto-Mon–Khmer) speaking people, possibly traced to the ancient Dong Son culture. Modern linguists describe Vietnamese as having lost some Proto-Austroasiatic phonological and morphological features that the original Vietnamese language had. This was noted in the linguistic separation of Vietnamese from Vietnamese-Muong roughly one thousand years ago. From  111 BC up to the 20th century, Vietnamese literature was written in Văn ngôn (Classical Chinese or Literary Chinese), using chữ Hán (Chinese characters) and then also Nôm from the 10th century to 20th century (Chinese characters adapted for vernacular Vietnamese).

Chữ Nôm began to be used as early as the 8th century in prose fiction and poetry in Vietnamese and had gained widespread use by the 10th century. It was formalized under the Hồ and the Tây Sơn dynasties. Chữ Nôm used chữ Hán for Sino-Vietnamese vocabulary and an adapted set of characters to transcribe native Vietnamese, with Vietnamese approximations of Middle Chinese pronunciations. The two concurrent scripts existed until the era of French Indochina when the Latin alphabet chữ quốc ngữ gradually became the current written medium of literature. In the past, Sanskrit and Indic texts also contributed to Vietnamese literature either from religious ideas from Mahayana Buddhism, or from historical influence of Champa and Khmer.

Terminology
In Vietnamese, Chinese characters go by several names, but all refer to the same script:

 Chữ Hán (𡨸漢) or Hán tự (漢字): "words of Hán" or "Hán characters/words". 漢字 is also pronounced as Hanzi in Standard Chinese, Hanja in Korean, and Kanji in Japanese. 
 Hán văn (漢文): "Han writing" or "Han literature", also pronounced as Hanwen in Standard Chinese, Hanmun in Korean, and Kanbun in Japanese. Meaning Classical Chinese.
 Chữ Nho (𡨸儒, "words of Confucians").

The Vietnamese word chữ 𡨸 (character, script, writing, letter) is derived from a Middle Chinese pronunciation of 字 (Modern Mandarin Chinese in Pinyin: zì), meaning 'character'.

Từ Hán Việt (詞漢越, "Sino-Vietnamese words") refers to cognates or terms borrowed from Chinese into the Vietnamese language, usually preserving the phonology of the original Chinese that was introduced to Vietnamese. As for syntax and vocabulary this Sino-Vietnamese language was no more different from the Chinese of Beijing than medieval English Latin was different from the Latin of Rome. Its major influence comes from Vietnamese Literary Chinese (Chữ Hán).

The term chữ Nôm (𡨸喃, "Southern characters") refers to the former transcription system for vernacular Vietnamese-language texts, written using a mixture of original Chinese characters and locally coined Nôm characters not found in Chinese to phonetically represent local Vietnamese words, meanings and their sound. However, the character set for chữ Nôm is extensive, containing up to 37,000 characters, and many are both arbitrary in composition and inconsistent in pronunciation.

Hán Nôm (漢喃, "Hán and chữ Nôm characters") may mean both Hán and Nôm taken together as in the research remit of Hanoi's Hán-Nôm Institute, or refer to texts which are written in a mixture of Hán and Nôm, or some Hán texts with parallel Nôm translations. There is a significant orthographic overlap between Hán and Nôm and many characters are used in both Hán and Nôm with the same reading. It may be simplest to think of Nôm as the Vietnamese extension of Han characters. The term chữ quốc ngữ (𡨸國語, "national language script") means Vietnamese written in the Latin alphabet.

History

Chữ Hán

Possibly even a thousand years earlier, in the late first millennium BC, Yuè elites in what is now southern China may have already adopted a form of writing based on Chinese characters to record terms from their own languages. During the Chinese rule from 111 BC to 905 AD, Chinese characters had been used as the official writing of the region. Local texts written in Chinese probably also included some characters adapted to represent Proto-Viet-Mường sounds, usually personal names or Vietic toponyms that had no Chinese equivalent. According to some scholars, the adoption  or  had been started by Shi Xie (137–226), but many disagree.

These writings were at first indistinguishable from contemporaneous classical Chinese works produced in China, Korea or Japan.

By 1174,  had become the official writing script of the court, mainly used by administration and literati, and continued to serve this role until the mid-19th century during French colonial rule when the traditional writing system was abolished in favour of transliterated .

Sino-Vietnamese readings of  

In Vietnam,  texts were read with the vocalization of Chinese text, called , similar to Chinese on-yomi in Japanese , or the assimilated vocalizations in Korean  (/). This occurred alongside the diffusion of Sino-Vietnamese vocabulary into vernacular Vietnamese, and created a Sinoxenic dialect. The Sinologist Edwin G. Pulleyblank was the one of the first linguists to actively employ "Sino-Vietnamese" to recover earlier histories of China.

Chữ Nôm 

 
From the 13th century, the dominance of Chinese characters began to be challenged by chữ Nôm, a different writing system based on the Chinese script to transcribe native Vietnamese words. These were even more difficult than Chinese characters themselves. Nôm script borrowed Chinese characters in their phonetic and semantic values to create new characters.

Whilst designed for native Vietnamese words, Nôm required the user to have a fair knowledge of chữ Hán, and thus chữ Nôm was used primarily for literary writings by cultural elites (such as the poetry of Nguyễn Du and Hồ Xuân Hương), while almost all other official writings and documents continued to be written in classical Chinese until the 20th century.

Though technically different from chữ Hán, it is simplest to think of Nôm as a derivation of chữ Hán for vernacular Vietnamese, with  modifications and new Vietnamese-coined logograms. Together, they are called Hán Nôm. Ultimately Nôm was deemed an inferior method of enabling mass communication and transcription of Vietnamese speech, with the Latin script seen as more practical.

Quốc Âm Tân Tự 

Quốc Âm Tân Tự (chữ Nôm: 國音新字), literally 'new script of national sound (language)', was a writing system for Vietnamese proposed in the mid-19th century. Two documents written on this type of script (four pages each) are kept at the Institute for the Study of Han Nom: An older unnamed manuscript, and a more recent copy called Quoc Am Tan Tu (國音新字). There is no information in the text of the Quốc Âm Tân Tự that indicates the specific date and year this work was written.  Based on the fact that in the preface of the work the last stroke of the character "華" (Hoa) has been omitted due to naming taboo), it can be guessed that this text was written during the reign of Emperor Thiệu Trị (whose mother's name was "Hồ Thị Hoa" 胡氏華). At the end of the text's preface, there is a line "五星聚斗南城居士阮子書" (Ngũ Tinh Tụ Đẩu Nam Thành Cư Sĩ Nguyễn Tử Thư). Through this inscription, it can be known that the author of Quốc Âm Tân Tự is a layman with the surname Nguyễn (阮) in Nam Định citadel (南定) with the nickname Ngũ Tinh Tụ Đẩu (五星聚斗).

Quốc Âm Tân Tự is a type of phonetic script made from the strokes of Chinese and Nôm characters, similar to Hiragana and Katakana of Japanese or Zhuyin Fuhao (bopomofo) in Chinese. Based on the pronunciation of Vietnamese, there are 22 cán tự (幹字) and 110 chi tự (枝字) ("cán" means trunk, "chi" means branches, "tự" means character). Cán tự is used to record the first consonant, and the chi tự is used to write the rhyme. Each character is named with a word that rhymes "ông" with the first consonant being the first consonant that the character signifies, for example, the word "đ" denotes the consonant "đ" is named "đông" (similar to today, the Vietnamese call the consonant "đ" the sound "đờ"). Quốc Âm Tân Tự does not distinguish between "d" and "gi" as in Quốc ngữ (possibly because the author followed the Northern accent when "d" and "gi" sound almost the same).  There is a shank used to record the initial consonant /ʔ/, which is named "ông".

The author of Quốc Âm Tân Tự used four stroke types: (一), (丨), (丶), (丿) (also including "㇏" as a variant of "丶") to create the characters. Every character (including all "trunk" and "branch" characters) has a total of four strokes. Most of the characters only use two or three stroke types, but the total number of strokes is exactly four.

Quốc Âm Tân Tự uses the traditional "tone" division, the tones are divided into four categories: "bình" (平), "thượng" (上), "khứ" (去), "nhập" (入).  Each type is further divided into two degrees, "yin" (陰) and "yang" (陽). There are eight tones in total:

Âm bình or yīn píng 陰平: is thanh ngang as it is called today.
Dương Bình or yáng píng 陽平: is thanh huyền as it is called today.
Âm thượng or yīn shàng 陰上: is thanh hỏi as it is called today.
Dương thượng or yáng shàng 陽上: is thanh ngã as it is called today.
Âm khứ or yīn qù 陰去: is thanh sắc in words that, when written in Quốc ngữ, do not end with "c", "ch", "p", or "t".
Dương khứ or yáng qù 陽去: is thanh nặng in words that, when written in Quốc ngữ, do not end with "c", "ch", "p", or "t".
âm nhập or yīn rù 陰入: is thanh sắc in words that, when written in Quốc ngữ, do end with "c", "ch", "p", or "t".
"Dương nhập or yáng rù" 陽入: is a heavy bar in words that, when written in Quốc ngữ, do end with "c", "ch", "p", or "t".

Tones of "âm" ("yīn") degree are marked with a small semi-circle, and tones of "dương" ("yáng") degree are marked with a small circle mark. To indicate serenity, the tone is placed next to the "left foot" of the word, with the bar mark placed next to the "left shoulder" of the word, with the accent bar placed next to the "right shoulder" of the text, with the accent bar placed next to the "right foot" of the text.

Quốc Âm Tân Tự can be written vertically or horizontally like Han characters and Nôm characters, and is a set of phonetic scripts created by the Vietnamese themselves (when chữ Nôm is a logographic system created by the Vietnamese, Quốc Ngữ is a phonetic script created by a foreigner). Unfortunately, when Quốc Âm Tân Tự was born, it didn't have enough time to be completed and popularized like Kana in Japan, because the political and social situation of Vietnam was too complicated at that time due to the gradual weakening of Nguyễn rule and the beginning of the French invasion.

Chữ Quốc ngữ 

Vietnamese in Latin script, called Chữ quốc ngữ, is the currently-used script. It was first developed by Portuguese missionaries in the 17th century, based on the pronunciation of Portuguese language and alphabet. For 200 years, chu quoc ngu was mainly used within the Catholic community. However, during French administration, the alphabet was further modified and then later made a part of compulsory education in 1910.

Meanwhile, the use of classical Chinese and its written form chu Hán started to decline. At this time there were briefly four competing writing systems in Vietnam; chữ Hán, chữ Nôm, chữ quốc ngữ, and French. Although the first romanized script chữ quốc ngữ newspaper, Gia Dinh Bao, was founded in 1865, Vietnamese nationalists continued to use chữ Nôm until after the First World War.

After French rule, chữ quốc ngữ became the favored written language of the Vietnamese independence movement.

BBC journalist Nguyễn Giang noted that while the early Christian missionaries are credited with creating the Vietnamese alphabet, what they did wasn't unique or difficult and would have been done later without them had they not created it. Giang further stated that the main reason for the popularisation of the Latin alphabet in the Nguyễn dynasty (the French protectorates of Annam and Tonkin) was because of the pioneering efforts by intellectuals from French Cochinchina combined with the progressive and scientific policies of the French government in French Indochina, that created the momentum for the usage of chữ Quốc ngữ to spread. Giang stated that the Tonkin Free School only removed the stigma against using chữ Quốc ngữ for the Nguyễn dynasty elites, but didn't actually popularise it.

An important reason why Latin script became the standard writing system of Vietnam but did not do so in Cambodia and Laos that were both dominated by the French for a similar amount of time and existed within the same colonial framework has to do with the fact that the Emperors of the Nguyễn dynasty heavily promoted its usage. According to the historian Liam Kelley in his 2016 work "Emperor Thành Thái's Educational Revolution" neither the French nor the revolutionaries had enough power to spread the usage of chữ Quốc ngữ down to the village level. It was by imperial decree in 1906 that the Thành Thái Emperor parents could decide whether their children will follow a curriculum in Hán văn (漢文) or Nam âm (南音, "Southern sound", the contemporary Nguyễn dynasty name for chữ Quốc ngữ). This decree was issued at the same time when other social changes, such as the cutting of long male hair, were occurring.

As a result of extensive education in chữ quốc ngữ, Vietnamese unversed in Chinese characters or Chinese-origin words are unable to read earlier Vietnamese texts written in Hán-Nôm. The Hán Nôm Institute is the national centre for academic research into Hán-Nôm literature. Although there have been movements to restore Hán-Nôm in Vietnam, via education in schools or usage in everyday life, almost all ancient poems and literary texts have been translated to and converted to chữ Quốc ngữ, which makes the need for literacy in Hán-Nôm almost obsolete. However, many Vietnamese find it difficult to detach themselves from their Hán-Nôm legacy, and may still feel an intimate relationship with Chinese characters.

Sanskrit, Cham, Khmer and Indic scripts
Sanskrit texts have often been passed over and translated to Vietnamese indirectly from Chinese texts via religious teachings from Buddhist sectors, or directly, such as from Champa and Khmer. One of the most significant landmarks still remaining to this day is the ancient Mỹ Sơn Hindu Temple which has Sanskrit and Champa inscriptions. The Võ Cạnh inscription is also the oldest Sanskrit inscription ever found in Southeast Asia, a legacy of Lâm Ấp, Champa, and Funan kingdoms. The most well-known modern Vietnamese phrase with Sanskrit phrase is from common religious Buddhist mantra नमोऽमिताभाय/ Namo Amitābhāya (Nam mô A Di Đà Phật / 南無阿彌陀佛), meaning, "Hail Buddha of Infinite Light" (translated directly from Sanskrit) or "I pay homage to the Enlightened One immeasurable" / "I turn to rely on the Enlightened One immeasurable". Additionally, many sites in Vietnam have names that are Khmer in origin, from when the land was under Funan and Chenla reign, etc. For example, ស្រុកឃ្លាំង Srok Khleang is written as Sóc Trăng in Vietnamese. Hence, there is some Khmer influence in Mekong Delta, Vietnam.

Tai Dam script
The Tai Viet script is the abugida used by the Tai Dam people and other Southwest Tai-speaking peoples in Northern Vietnam, from 16th century to present-day, derived from the Fakkham script of Tai Lanna people.

Jawi script
From the onset of the 18th century, Cham communities in the Mekong Delta began adopting the Arabic-derived Jawi script. Today, the Western Cham (Cambodian and Mekong Delta Cham whom majority are Sunni Muslims) use both Jawi and Latin alphabets to write their language, compared to the Eastern Cham who are mostly Bani Muslims and Balamon and still using Akhar Thrah (traditional) script and Latin alphabets.

Modern usage of chữ Hán and chữ Nôm

Individual chữ Hán are still written by calligraphers for special occasions such as the Vietnamese New Year, Tết. They are still present outside Buddhist temples and are still studied for scholarly and religious purposes.

Vietnamese calligraphy (Thư pháp chữ Việt) has enjoyed tremendous success at the expense of chữ Hán calligraphy since its introduction in the 1950's.

Since the mid-1990s however, there has been a resurgence in the teaching of Chinese characters, both for chữ Hán and the additional characters used in chữ Nôm. This is to enable the study of Vietnam's long history as well as cultural synthesis and unification.

For linguists, the Sino-Vietnamese readings of Chinese characters provide data for the study of historical Chinese phonology and reconstruction of the Old Chinese language.

Additionally, many Vietnamese may study Han characters to learn other languages such as Chinese, Japanese, and sometimes Korean. This can make it easier to study these languages due to the high concentration of Chinese-cognate words. Hence, they also end up with some measure of fluency with Hán-Nôm characters.

The significance of the characters has occasionally entered western depiction of Vietnam, especially since French rule. For instance, novelist E. M. Nathanson mentions chu Hán in A Dirty Distant War (1987).

Mixed script 

It is known that Ho Chi Minh wrote in a mixed Vietnamese Latin–Hán-Nôm script. 

From the Sino-Vietnamese readings, some words have ended up in common vernacular Vietnamese. For example, "nhất" (一) has come to mean "first" and "tứ" (四) has come to mean fourth in vernacular Vietnamese. Modern Vietnamese can be thought of as a romanised or transliteration rendering of common Hán-Nôm words, that has since been used as the main medium of language in Vietnam.

See also 
Related romanisations:

 Portuguese Alphabet (Vietnamese alphabet was largely based on the conventions of the Romance languages)

References

Works cited

External links 
  Hán tự: A Vietnamese-Chinese wordlist (via Wayback Machine)
 Từ điển Hán Việt Thiều Chửu (via Wayback Machine)
 Hán Việt Từ Điển Trích Dẫn, Vietnamese Han character dictionary
 Thiều Chửu dictionary
 :vi:Chữ viết tiếng Việt (contains additional info that has yet to be translated into the English wiki)
 https://www.britannica.com/art/Vietnamese-literature

Chinese characters
Writing systems
Vietnamese writing systems
Logographic writing systems
History of Vietnam